Avni Doshi (born 1982) is an American novelist currently based in Dubai. She was born in New Jersey to immigrants from India. She received a BA in Art History from Barnard College in New York, and a master's degree in History of Art from University College London. Her debut novel, Girl in White Cotton, was published in India in 2019. In 2020, it was published in the United Kingdom under the title Burnt Sugar. The novel was shortlisted for the 2020 Booker Prize.

Personal life
Doshi grew up in New Jersey's Fort Lee but often spent the winter in Pune, India, where her mother's family lived. She lived in India for seven years during her mid-twenties, where she worked as a curator in various art galleries (such as Latitude 28 in Delhi and Art musings in Mumbai).

She is married with two children and currently resides in Dubai.

Bibliography

Novel

Journalism

References 

1982 births
Living people
21st-century American novelists
American novelists of Indian descent
American women novelists
American women writers of Indian descent
American expatriates in the United Arab Emirates
Novelists from New Jersey
Barnard College alumni
Alumni of University College London
People from Fort Lee, New Jersey
American art historians
Women art historians
American art curators
American women curators
People from Dubai
21st-century American women writers
Historians from New Jersey